is a Japanese male badminton player. He was a member of the Gifu Tricky Panders badminton club. In 2012, he won the Maldives International tournament in the men's doubles event partnered with Tomoya Takashina.

Achievements

BWF International Challenge/Series
Men's Doubles

 BWF International Challenge tournament
 BWF International Series tournament
 BWF Future Series tournament

References

External links 
 

1988 births
Living people
Sportspeople from Nara Prefecture
Japanese male badminton players
21st-century Japanese people